One Step at a Time may refer to:
 One Step at a Time (George Strait album) (1998)
 "One Step at a Time" (Buddy Jewell song) (2004)
 "One Step at a Time" (Brenda Lee song) (1957)
 "One Step at a Time" (Jordin Sparks song) (2008)
 One Step at a Time, a 2010 Francis Rossi album
 "One Step at a Time", a song by Hüsker Dü from Zen Arcade